Human Dam is an earthfill and gravity dam on the Human river near Chandrapur in the state of Maharashtra in India.

Specifications

Purpose
Irrigation.

See also
 Dams in Maharashtra
 List of reservoirs and dams in India

References

Dams in Chandrapur district
Year of establishment missing